Tomás Mac Eoin (born 1937) is an Irish sean-nós singer, actor, songwriter and poet. He is best known as Tomás 'Jimmy' Mac Eoin from An Bóthar Buí in An Cheathrú Rua, Conamara, Galway, Ireland.

Renowned for his old-style or sean-nós singing, he was voted the best sean-nós singer in Ireland in 1967 at the Oireachtas competitions and won the Ó'Riada Trophy.

Some of Tomás's best known material include:
 The Stolen Child ** (Tomás Mac Eoin / Mike Scott)
 An Cailín Álainn
 Bleán na Bó
 Amhrán an Bhingó
 An Rock an' Roll

Regular singer on RTÉ Raidió na Gaeltachta, he also performed on The Late Late Show with Gay Byrne several times.

Appeared on the Fisherman's Blues album with the Waterboys

See also
An tOireachtas

References

External links
Waterboys Fisherman Blues review
Rolling Stone Review
Cló Iar-Chonnachta 2002 recorded material
Interview with Máirtín Tom Sheáinín on Ardtráthnóna with RTÉ Raidió na Gaeltachta

1937 births
20th-century Irish male singers
Living people
Musicians from County Galway
Sean-nós singers